Age of Reptiles may refer to:
The Mesozoic era, a time in geologic history
 Age of Reptiles (comics)
 Age of Reptiles (album), an album by Showbread
The Age of Reptiles, a large natural history mural